Charles Steele von Stade (November 24, 1919 – April 10, 1945) was an American polo champion.

Biography

Personal life
Charles Steele von Stade was born in Old Westbury, Long Island, New York on November 24, 1919 to Francis Skiddy von Stade, Sr. (1884–1967) and Kathryn Nevitt Steele (1896–1981). He was raised in Saratoga Springs, New York, and trained as an architect.  He married Sara Worthington Clucas (1918–1983) in Gladstone, New Jersey on January 24, 1942.

Polo
In 1941, together with John H. H. Phipps, Michael Grace Phipps and Alan L. Corey, Jr., he won the U.S. Open Polo Championship at the Meadow Brook Polo Club against the Westbury team (Gerald Dempsey, Earle Hopping, Stewart Iglehart and Windsor Holden White).

Military service
Von Stade enlisted in the United States Army in March 1942, achieving rank of First Lieutenant. While fighting to liberate Europe from the Nazi regime in the Second World War, he was killed in action in Germany on April 10, 1945 when his Jeep ran over a land mine. He is buried at the Netherlands American Cemetery and Memorial in Eijsden-Margraten, Netherlands.

Elegies
During his time in service, Charles von Stade wrote several heart-felt letters to his wife, who was pregnant with their second child. Their daughter, Frederica von Stade, was born after he was killed in World War II, and grew to become an internationally renowned opera singer. She had long wished to turn some of the letters by her father into a song cycle. Eventually some of his words and expressions were fashioned into poems by Kim Vaeth and in 1997, Richard Danielpour completed composition of the music. The resulting work, entitled Elegies, was a cycle of songs for mezzo-soprano, baritone, and chamber orchestra,  which was performed at Carnegie Hall. According to Classics Today, "The five songs form a sort of a conversation across the gulf of time between father and daughter. The text alludes to their separation, longing for each other, and their eventual reconciliation on the spiritual plane."

Elegies has been recorded by Sony Masterworks, with Frederica von Stade, Thomas Hampson, and the London Philharmonic Orchestra and Perspectives Ensemble conducted by Roger Nierenberg.

References

American polo players
United States Army personnel killed in World War II
1919 births
1945 deaths
Sportspeople from KwaZulu-Natal
United States Army officers
Landmine victims
South African emigrants to the United States